Toyotsu Fighting Eagles Nagoya is a Japanese professional basketball team located in Nagoya, Aichi. The team currently competes in the B.League.

Roster

Notable players
Solomon Alabi
Paul Butorac
Rodney Carney
Andrew Feeley
Jerald Honeycutt
Herbert Hill
Yuto Otsuka
John Pierce
Lamar Rice
Garrett Stutz
Scott VanderMeer
Dan Weiss

Arenas
Biwajima Sports Center
Nagoya City Chikusa Sports Center
Nagoya City Nakamura Sports Center

Gallery

Practice facilities
Toyota Tsusho Midori Gymnasium

References

 
Basketball teams in Japan
Basketball teams established in 1957
1957 establishments in Japan